Lioglyphostoma crebriforma is a species of sea snail, a marine gastropod mollusk in the family Pseudomelatomidae, the turrids and allies.

Distribution
This marine species occurs in the Sea of Cortez, West Mexico

References

 Shasky, Donald R., and G. B. Campbell. "New and otherwise interesting species of mollusks from Guaymas, Sonora, Mexico." Veliger 7.2 (1964): 114-120.

External links
 

crebriforma
Gastropods described in 1964